The Village is the oldest part of East Kilbride in South Lanarkshire, Scotland, dating back to well before its designation as a new town in the mid-20th century.

Notable landmarks include the East Kilbride Parish Church dating from the 1770s, the Village Theatre and the railway line to Glasgow which terminates at East Kilbride railway station (plus the path of the former continuation of the line towards Hamilton). The Category A listed Dollan Baths are situated in the Town Centre Park which separates the Village from the central area of the town including the indoor East Kilbride Shopping Centre.

Of a more traditional character in comparison to the modern facilities in 'the centre', the Village hosts several small pubs, restaurants, hairdressers, cafes, tanning salons and shops. In the oldest part of The Village there is a cobbled street and a large pub, the Montgomerie Arms, the building for which dates back to the 1650s – the "loupin' on stane", used by inn patrons for mounting their horses, still stands outside the premises. East Kilbride Thistle F.C.'s home ground and social club, the Show Park, is also located in the area. Nearby residential neighbourhoods are Calderwood, East Mains and West Mains, which also have some buildings pre-dating the construction of the new town in the 1950s and 60s but were greatly expanded in that era to surround the Village.

East Kilbride High School (Known as the old Village High School) was built in 1880 and closed in 1984. Until 2008, it was the home of South Lanarkshire College when it was sold by the college to Tulloch Homes who then demolished the school to make way for new 89 homes – new facilities for the college were built further east within the town.

See also
Cumbernauld Village  
Livingston Village

References

External links 

Areas of East Kilbride